Gabriel II may refer to:

 Pope Gabriel II of Alexandria, ruled in 1131–1145
 Gabriel II of Constantinople, Ecumenical Patriarch in 1657
 Gabriel II Barbosa, Brazilian footballer